Arnulfo G. Acedera, Jr.  (19 December 1941 – 15 June 2020) was a Filipino general who served as the Commanding General of the Philippine Air Force and as the Chief of Staff of the Armed Forces of the Philippines. He was a recipient of awards such as the Distinguished Service Star, Distinguished Aviation Cross, Bronze Cross Medal and Silver Wing Medal.

Biography
Acedera was born on December 19, 1941, in Cardona, Rizal. He wanted to study at the Mapua Institute of Technology and that way get a degree in civil engineering, but changed his mind and went to the Philippine Military Academy instead in 1959 from which he graduated four years later. He continued on studying flying in Lipa, Batangas at the PAF Flying School from which he graduated in 1965. From 1966 to 1967 he was a commander for both the 3rd and 4th PAF Detachments which were part of 601st Liaison Squadron and 205th Composite Wing. In 1973 he flew Lockheed C-130 Hercules for training purposes at Lockheed Martin, Marietta, Georgia. In 1976 he took Swearingen Merlin course at San Antonio, Texas, and by 1983 passed a course at the Command and General Staff College, Fort Bonifacio. From June 14 to November 8, 1994, he became Deputy Chief of Staff and from November 8 of the same year to December 26 of the next year, worked at the Armed Forces of the Philippines. From the same date and till November 28, 1996, he was a commanding General of the Philippine Air Force and then until December 17, 1997, was a Chief of Staff in the Armed Forces of the Philippines.

Awards in military service
  Philippine Republic Presidential Unit Citation
  Martial Law Unit Citation
  People Power I Unit Citation
  Philippine Legion of Honor
   Distinguished Service Star
  Distinguished Aviation Cross
  Disaster Relief & Rehabilitation Operation Ribbon
  Anti-dissidence Campaign Medal
  Luzon Anti Dissidence Campaign Medal
  Visayas Anti-Dissidence Campaign Medal
  Mindanao Anti-dissidence Campaign Medal
  Long Service Medal

References

1941 births
2020 deaths
People from Rizal
Filipino generals
Chairmen of the Joint Chiefs (Philippines)
Philippine Military Academy alumni
Philippine Air Force generals
Recipients of the Distinguished Service Star
Recipients of the Presidential Medal of Merit (Philippines)
Recipients of the Philippine Legion of Honor
Ramos administration personnel